The Eureka was an American automobile made from 1907 to 1909. It was a wheel-steered high wheeler from St. Louis, Missouri, with a two-cylinder 10/12 hp air-cooled engine and conventional sliding gear transmission.

See also

Eureka (1900 automobile)
Eureka (French automobile)

References

 
 

Defunct motor vehicle manufacturers of the United States

1900s cars
Brass Era vehicles
Highwheeler